Zúñiga may refer to:

Zúñiga (surname)
Zuniga (spider), a genus of jumping spider
Zúñiga, Navarre, a town  in northern Spain
Zúñiga District, in Peru
Zuniga Glacier, in West Antarctica
Deportivo Zúñiga, a Peruvian football club, playing in the city of Lima, Peru
House of Zúñiga, a Spanish noble family descending of the kings of Navarre